Burleson Independent School District is a public school district based in Burleson, Texas (USA).  The district was founded in 1909 by the citizens of Burleson. In addition to Burleson, the district also serves Briaroaks, Cross Timber, Fort Worth, Rendon, and a small portion of Crowley. Most of Burleson ISD is in Johnson County, but a small portion is in Tarrant County.

In 2009, the school district was rated "academically acceptable" by the Texas Education Agency.

Students

Academics

Students in Burleson typically outperform local region and statewide averages on standardized tests.  In 2015-2016 State of Texas Assessments of Academic Readiness (STAAR) results, 81% of students in Burleson ISD met Level II Satisfactory standards, compared with 77% in Region 11 and 75% in the state of Texas. The average SAT score of the class of 2015 was 1452, and the average ACT score was 22.1.

Demographics
In the 2015-2016 school year, the school district had a total of 11,342 students, ranging from early childhood education and pre-kindergarten through grade 12. The class of 2015 included 752 graduates; the annual drop-out rate across grades 9-12 was less than 1%.

As of the 2015-2016 school year, the ethnic distribution of the school district was 68.9% White, 20.7% Hispanic, 5.6% African American, 1.0% Asian, 0.6% American Indian, 0.2% Pacific Islander, and 2.9% from two or more races. Economically disadvantaged students made up 36.9% of the student body.

Schools

High Schools (Grades 9-12)
Burleson High School
Burleson Centennial High School
Burleson Collegiate High School
Crossroads High School

Middle Schools (Grades 6-8)
Hughes Middle School
Kerr Middle School
STEAM Middle School of Choice
GDDS Secondary School (6-12)

Elementary Schools (Grades PK-5)
Academy at Nola Dunn
Academy of the Arts at Bransom
Academy of Leadership and Technology at Mound Elementary School
Ann Brock Elementary School
Irene Clinkscale Elementary School
Frazier Elementary School
Judy Hajek Elementary School
JW Norwood Elementary School
Jack Taylor Elementary School
STEAM Academy at Stribling Elementary

External links
Burleson ISD

References

School districts in Johnson County, Texas
School districts in Tarrant County, Texas
School districts in Fort Worth, Texas